The Dai Chopan are a  tribe of Hazara people, who live in Afghanistan. They are generally numbered among the eight overarching Hazara tribes. the district with the same name Dai Chopan in Zabul Province is derived from this tribe. Dai Chopan are the descendants of Amir Chopan, a Hazara chieftain and whose grave is at Grishk, Helmand Province.

See also 
 List of Hazara tribes

References 

Hazara people
Hazara tribes